Varale is a village in Khed taluka of Pune district in the state of Maharashtra, India.

Administration
The village is administrated by a sarpanch, an elected representative who leads a gram panchayat. In 2019, the village was not itself listed as a seat of a gram panchayat, meaning that the local administration was shared with one or more other villages.

Demographics
At the 2011 Census of India, the village comprised 1633 households. The population of 7202 was split between 3785 males and 3417 females.

See also
List of villages in khed taluka

References

Villages in Mawal taluka